Stasimopus schoenlandi is a species of spider in the family Stasimopidae from South Africa. This species occurs syntopically with S. mandelai and a number of other mygalomorph spiders at the Great Fish River Nature Reserve.

References

Stasimopidae
Endemic fauna of South Africa
Spiders of South Africa
Spiders described in 1900